Bioinspiration is the development of novel materials, devices, and structures inspired by solutions found in biological evolution and refinement which has occurred over millions of years. The goal is to improve modeling and simulation of the biological system to attain a better understanding of nature's critical structural features, such as a wing, for use in future bioinspired designs. Bioinspiration differs from biomimicry in that the latter aims to precisely replicate the designs of biological materials. Bioinspired research is a return to the classical origins of science: it is a field based on observing the remarkable functions that characterize living organisms and trying to abstract and imitate those functions.

History 
Ideas in science and technology often arise from studying nature. In the 16th and 17th century, G. Galilei, J. Kepler and I. Newton studied the motion of the sun and the planets and developed the first empirical equation to describe gravity. A few years later, M. Faraday and J. C. Maxwell derived the fundamentals of electromagnetism by examining interactions between electrical currents and magnets. The studies of heat transfer and mechanical work lead to the understanding of thermodynamics. However, quantum mechanics originated from the spectroscopic study of light. Current objects of attention have originated in chemistry but the most abundant of them are found in biology, e.g. the study of genetics, characteristics of cells and the development of higher animals and disease.

The current field of research
Bio-inspiration is a solidly established strategy in the field of chemistry, but it is not a mainstream approach. Especially, this research is still developing its scientific and technological systems, on academic and industrial levels. In recent years, it is also considered to develop composites for aerospace and military applications.

This field dates back from the 1980s but in the 2010s, many natural phenomena have not been studied.

Typical characteristics of bioinspiration

Function
Bio-inspired research is quite different from chemistry research. This research does not focus on complexity and microscopic things like molecular structure. It is based on observing and understanding the functions from the products of biological evolution.

A limitless source of ideas
There are various kinds of organisms and many different strategies that have proved successful in biology at solving some functional problem. Some kinds of high-level bio functions may seem simple, but they are supported by many layers of underlying structures, processes, molecules and their elaborate interaction. There is no chance to run out of phenomena for bio-inspired research.

Simplicity
Often, bio-inspired research about something can be much easier than precisely replicating the source of inspiration. For example, researchers do not have to know how a bird flies to make an airplane.

Transcultural field
Bio-inspiration returns to observation of nature as a source of inspiration for problem-solving and make it part of a grand tradition. The simplicity of many solutions emerge from a bio-inspired strategy, combined with the fact that different geographical and cultural regions have different types of contact with animals, fish, plants, birds and even microorganisms. This means different regions will have intrinsic advantages in areas in which their natural landscape is rich. So bio-inspired research is trans-cultural field.

Technical applications 
There are many technical applications available nowadays that are bioinspired. However, this term should not be mixed up with biomimicry. For example, an airplane in general is inspired by birds. The wing tips of an airplane are biomimetic because its original function of minimizing turbulence and therefore needing less energy to fly, is not changed or improved compared to nature's original. Also, Nano 3D printing method is also one of the novel method for bioinspiration. Plants and animals have particular properties which are often related to their composition of nano- and micro- surface structures. For example, research has been conducted to mimic the superhydrophobicity of Salvinia molesta leaves, the adhesiveness of gecko's toes even on slippery surfaces, and moth antennaes which inspire a new approach to detect chemical leaks, drugs and explosives.

References

<https://www.researchgate.net/publication/330246880_Biomimicry_Exploring_Research_Challenges_Gaps_and_Tools_Proceedings_of_ICoRD_2019_Volume_1/>

See also
 Bio-inspired computing
 Bio-inspired engineering
 Bio-inspired photonics
 Bio-inspired robotics
 Paleo-inspiration